Fritz Ruchay (12 December 1909 – 6 September 2000) was a German footballer and manager who played as a midfielder and made one appearance for the Germany national team.

Career
Ruchay earned his first and only cap for Germany on 13 October 1935 in a friendly against Latvia. The home match, which took place in Königsberg, finished as a 3–0 win for Germany.

Personal life
Ruchay died on 6 September 2000 at the age of 90.

Career statistics

International

References

External links
 
 
 
 
 
 

1909 births
2000 deaths
People from Pisz County
German footballers
Germany international footballers
Association football midfielders
SV Prussia-Samland Königsberg players
Tennis Borussia Berlin players
German football managers
SV Waldhof Mannheim managers
Stuttgarter Kickers managers
1. FC Pforzheim managers
Union Böckingen managers
Karlsruher FV managers